The first season of the American television series Agents of S.H.I.E.L.D., based on the Marvel Comics organization S.H.I.E.L.D., follows Phil Coulson and his team of S.H.I.E.L.D. agents on several dangerous cases revolving around Project Centipede and Coulson's mysterious resurrection following his death in the film The Avengers (2012). The season is set in the Marvel Cinematic Universe (MCU) and acknowledges the continuity of the franchise's films. It was produced by ABC Studios, Marvel Television, and Mutant Enemy Productions, with Jed Whedon, Maurissa Tancharoen, and Jeffrey Bell serving as showrunners.

Clark Gregg reprises his role as Coulson from the film series, and is joined by series regulars Ming-Na Wen, Brett Dalton, Chloe Bennet, Iain De Caestecker, and Elizabeth Henstridge. Agents of S.H.I.E.L.D. was picked up for a full season by ABC in May 2013, and filming took place primarily in Los Angeles. The main recurring setting of the season is the Bus, a retrofitted Boeing C-17 Globemaster III plane that was designed by visual effects company FuseFX, and created with CGI. Some episodes of the season directly crossover with the films Thor: The Dark World (2013) and Captain America: The Winter Soldier (2014), with the latter causing a major retooling of the season for its final six episodes. Several other actors also reprise their MCU roles in the season for guest appearances.

The season aired on ABC from September 24, 2013, to May 13, 2014, and consists of 22 episodes. Its pilot episode was watched by 12.12 million viewers, the highest ratings received by the first episode of a drama series since 2009, but ratings decreased as the season progressed. The critical reception was initially mixed, but grew more positive in the second half of the season and particularly after the crossover with The Winter Soldier. The series was renewed for a second season in May 2014.

Episodes

Cast and characters

Main
 Clark Gregg as Phil Coulson
 Ming-Na Wen as Melinda May
 Brett Dalton as Grant Ward
 Chloe Bennet as Skye
 Iain De Caestecker as Leo Fitz
 Elizabeth Henstridge as Jemma Simmons

Recurring
 J. August Richards as Mike Peterson / Deathlok
 David Conrad as Ian Quinn
 Ruth Negga as Raina
 Saffron Burrows as Victoria Hand
 Bill Paxton as John Garrett / The Clairvoyant
 B. J. Britt as Antoine Triplett

Notable guests
 Cobie Smulders as Maria Hill
 Samuel L. Jackson as Nick Fury
 Titus Welliver as Felix Blake
 Maximiliano Hernández as Jasper Sitwell
 Jaimie Alexander as Sif

Production

Development
In August 2012, it was announced that Marvel's The Avengers director Joss Whedon would be involved in an upcoming project for ABC, set within the Marvel Cinematic Universe. A few weeks later, ABC ordered a pilot for a show called S.H.I.E.L.D., to be written by Joss Whedon, Jed Whedon, and Maurissa Tancharoen, directed by Joss Whedon, and executive produced by Joss Whedon, Jed Whedon, Tancharoen, Jeffrey Bell, and Jeph Loeb. Jed Whedon, Tancharoen and Bell were slated to serve as the series' showrunners. Joe Quesada, Alan Fine, and Stan Lee also executive produce. In April 2013, ABC announced that the show would be titled Marvel's Agents of S.H.I.E.L.D., and it was officially picked up to series in May. In October, ABC announced that it had ordered a full season of 22 episodes. After the ratings for the early episodes were not to the liking of ABC, Marvel's Dan Buckley went to the network to request they allow the creatives to create the show they wanted, rather than try to work with notes from the network that asked the series to appeal to their main audience demographic, "upscale women".

Writing
In July 2013, Tancharoen revealed that alongside Joss Whedon, Jed Whedon, Jeff Bell, and herself, the writers for the season would include Paul Zbyszewski, Monica Owusu-Breen, Brent Fletcher, Lauren LeFranc, Rafe Judkins, and Shalisha Francis.

The character arcs were laid out by the series' creative team, with Marvel's only guidelines being to work around Captain America: The Winter Soldier, which sees S.H.I.E.L.D. destroyed. Jed Whedon said on this, "if someone told you that concept, you'd think it was a great thing to have happen at the beginning of the show or the end of Season 3. To have it happen in the middle of your first season is an interesting kind of riddle". The writers worked to establish a "regular day at S.H.I.E.L.D." and the existing hierarchy, and then "to blow that up, we knew the way to best illustrate that was by putting it on a personal level with our main man Coulson". Leading up to the Winter Soldier tie-in, the writers avoided talking about Hydra except in terms of their history in the MCU in order to avoid spoiling the film. Tancharoen elaborated that "We see what it actually looks like for S.H.I.E.L.D. to crumble in Captain America 2, we see the Helicarriers literally barreling through the Triskelion, we see the massive destruction throughout the city, but the benefit of our show is we get to dive into the emotional toll of that." Therefore, it was decided at the beginning of the series that one of the main characters would be a traitor, with Jed Whedon saying "since this is an infiltration based on betrayal on a massive scale, we wanted to have it on the small scale, and have it be a really personal dagger to the heart." Executives at ABC did not believe having Grant Ward be the traitor would work, because they felt Dalton was too handsome for the audience to believe it to be real. They felt the creatives should change their choice, and were keen on Jemma Simmons being the traitor, since it would have been unexpected given she was "so sweet". After dealing with the fall of S.H.I.E.L.D., the writers were able to "put the pedal to the metal" and shift from the standalone stories preceding it to more serialized episodes. Whedon would later say this shift was where "we found our voice in the series after a rocky start". Zbyszewski added that there had been resistance early in the season from the network to have serialized episodes, over single mysteries per episode.

On whether it was Marvel's idea or the showrunner's to have Coulson promoted to Director and tasked with rebuilding S.H.I.E.L.D. at the end of the season, Jed Whedon said "They're  the same. They have plans for films, and we have plans to intermingle with them, and it's the name of our show. The second to last episode is called "Ragtag", and that's a term we've used; we wanted to create this ragtag group, but within this giant organization with billions of dollars and support all over the globe and satellite feeds on their luxurious plane. Now we have a chance to start them over and figure out what it's like to really be a secret again."

Casting

The main cast for the season includes Clark Gregg as Phil Coulson, reprising his role from the film series, Ming-Na Wen as Melinda May, Brett Dalton as Grant Ward, Chloe Bennet as Skye, Iain De Caestecker as Leo Fitz, and Elizabeth Henstridge as Jemma Simmons.

In April 2013, J. August Richards, one of the stars of the earlier Joss Whedon series Angel, was cast in the pilot in an unspecified role, later revealed to be Mike Peterson, the first live-action portrayal of Deathlok and a recurring character throughout the season. Nicholas Brendon, another Whedon collaborator, was also reportedly considered for Richards' role. In December, two recurring characters were set to be added to the series with the episode "T.A.H.I.T.I." They were described as "an African-American agent who specializes in combat/weapons, and a high-level S.H.I.E.L.D. agent/munitions expert who has past ties to both Coulson and Ward." In January 2014, Bill Paxton was cast as Agent John Garrett, "a rough-and-tumble former cohort of Agent Coulson with a little bit of attitude and cigar-smoking swagger", for at least four episodes of the season. Jed Whedon said that "We actually discussed Bill Paxton in the room, when we were talking about the character ... Then when he came up as an actual possibility, we couldn't believe it." The next month, B. J. Britt was cast as Agent Antoine Triplett, an associate of Garrett. Other recurring guests in the season include Saffron Burrows as Victoria Hand, David Conrad as Ian Quinn, and Ruth Negga as Raina.

In January 2013, Cobie Smulders, who played agent Maria Hill in The Avengers, said that her character may make an appearance in the show and that her commitment to How I Met Your Mother would not prevent her from participating. Smulders reprised the role of Hill in the pilot, with Joss Whedon saying, "I wanted very much to have Cobie in the pilot because as much as anyone else, she  S.H.I.E.L.D." Smulders returned once again in the episode "Nothing Personal". In June 2013, Samuel L. Jackson expressed interest in guest starring as S.H.I.E.L.D. director Nick Fury, and subsequently appeared in the second episode "0-8-4". Jackson makes a second appearance in the season finale. During the episode "The Well", Chris Hemsworth appears as Thor via archival footage from Thor: The Dark World. Maximiliano Hernández and Jaimie Alexander also reprise their film roles, Jasper Sitwell and Sif, respectively. Titus Welliver reprises the role of Felix Blake from the Marvel One-Shots short films.

Design

Storyboards
Storyboards were used throughout the season, to "put the director, stunts, camera, FX and the crew on the same page", though Joss Whedon did not use them for the pilot. One of the storyboard artists, Warren Drummond, noted the process was different to that on films, because there was limited time to complete the work, and because the storyboard artists were often working with different directors for each episode. Most of the sequences storyboarded were action or science fiction sequences.

Sets
The main recurring setting for the season is the Bus, a retrofitted Boeing C-17 Globemaster III, that serves as both the transportation and headquarters of the titular team. The Bus includes such features as a soundproof interrogation room, a forensics and research lab located on the lower deck, where Fitz and Simmons work, and a cargo hold directly outside the lab where the team parks its SUV and Lola (which stands for Levitating Over Land Automobile), Coulson's prized 1962 Corvette. When designing the Bus, production designer Gregory Melton began with the basic design and shape of a C-17, before adjusting it to serve the needs of the season. The main interior set does not have many obtrusions, allowing it to be seen completely at either end of the set; this was requested by Joss Whedon, which Melton called "a tall order" given it needed to include the command center, lounge, crew quarters and galley. Construction on the sets for the Buss interior, interrogation room, and Fitz and Simmons' lab, which first appeared in the pilot and throughout the season, began on December 6, 2012.

Between the filming of the pilot and the start of the season filming, Melton was able to modify the sets, such as new flooring and equipment to the lab and additional lighting fixtures in the command center. Melton explained that because of the quick turnaround needed for the pilot, some details had to be sacrificed until the series was picked up for the season. Coulson's office set was also constructed, first appearing in "0-8-4", which was envisioned as a crow's nest, giving it Captain Nemo vibes. The lower level of the Bus is first seen in "Repairs", which Melton designed to be "a modular area of the plane that is full of pods... [that] we can do anything with", changing based on the episode's needs.

Costumes
According to costume designer Ann Foley, Coulson's suits, which she called "his armor", were more "streamlined" and a different cut than the ones he wore in the films, along with custom shirts and "slicker" ties. James Bond served as an early inspiration for Coulson's suits in the early part of the season, eventually shifting to a slim-cut suit. Additionally, Foley chose to avoid black suits and used solid shirts, another difference from the suits he wore in the films. Conversely to Coulson, Ward always wore black in order to look "leading-man sexy" according to Foley. May's flight suit was based on similar ones in the Air Force and featured "a tiny Y" 3D printed pattern that was the same used for Maria Hill's costume in The Avengers. For Skye, Foley wanted to set her apart from the other characters and looked to street-style blogs for design ideas. Skye's wardrobe was bright and vibrant at the start of the season, and slowly became more muted as the season went on to reflect her S.H.I.E.L.D. training and the season's darker tone. Foley tried to complement the styles for Fitz and Simmons, while not dressing them alike. Foley liked "to mix feminine elements with some masculine" such as floral prints "and the Peter-Pan collars with a tie and blazer". Simmons is also seen in her lab coat more than Fitz, since she is the biochemist. With Fitz, his costumes have "a little more heritage", wearing vests, cardigans, ties, plaid shirts, and jackets with patches on the elbows.

Filming
The pilot was produced almost entirely in Los Angeles to accommodate Joss Whedon's busy schedule, occurring from January 22 to February 11, 2013. The season resumed filming on July 17, also being produced in Los Angeles, as well as Culver City, California. Additional filming took place around the world, including in Paris, France, for "Pilot", Peru for "0-8-4", and in Stockholm, Sweden, for "Eye Spy".

The stunt coordinator for the season was Tanner Gill. In September 2013, Ming-Na Wen talked about stunts and action scenes on the series, saying "I have great stunt coordinators and choreographers to help me through every step and with the magic of filmmaking and editing, it all brings about her skills, to another level. That has to be very believable ... I think the hardest part is doing the actual stunts, the stunt-fighting. That's a whole other thing. I'm not really punching out the stunt guy, nor are they hitting me, so it's learning this dance, really, within the fight. It's how to pull back, how to take a hit and make it look real. 

As with many Marvel projects, secrecy was a big issue.  For instance, it was a challenge keeping Samuel L. Jackson's cameo in "0-8-4" a surprise due to "this age of tweets and spoilers". The showrunners had been exposed to this while working on The Avengers, but with their own series they were able to see "all the details that go into keeping everything under lock and key". Filming for the season concluded on April 9, 2014.

Visual effects
The visual effects supervisor for the season was Mark Kolpack, with Los Angeles-based visual effects company FuseFX the main visual effects vendor. Kevin Lingenfelser started the season focused on 2D supervising, but took over as lead in-house visual effects supervisor after episode eight from David Altenau. Two separate production management and creative teams were established to work on the show, with most of the episodes being worked on concurrently, either two or three at a time.

For the Bus, Altenau explained that it "has all kinds of S.H.I.E.L.D. technology that is revealed over time as the series progresses. This includes an extra wing and engines in the rear giving the plane the ability to operate vertically for take-offs and landings, and even mid-flight u-turns ... FuseFX was given the opportunity to design the Bus. The design included many features from the start, such as the ability to do vertical take-offs and landing". FuseFX designed the Bus, and "Extreme attention was paid when designing the textures and rigging for this asset. Half a dozen 8k maps make up the details on the plane which allows the camera to get right up to the surface of the plane without any loss of detail. A very complex rig controls every aspect of the plane from the landing gear, engine transformation, doors opening, lighting and even the wings have flex controls for the animators to sell the weight of this massive aircraft. When the engines are in vertical flight mode they have several degrees of rotation which gives the jet a lot of maneuvering ability." 

FuseFX also worked on Lola, Coulson's "vintage 1962 Corvette" which was described as "a classic car and beautiful in its own right, but through digital effects, Fuse has added hovercraft capabilities. When Coulson needs it, the wheel's rotate into a horizontal position, exposing hidden jet engine ducts that create lifting thrust through the rims of the tires, which double as turbo-fan blades. We worked closely with production to help design the mechanism and the look of the hovercraft engines. It's Stark technology designed to be consistent with the period aspect of the car." When the real Corvette is shown transitioning to its hover mode, volumetric dust, exhaust, and particle effects are added. Occasionally, FuseFX was required to use a fully digital model of the car, which matches the real vehicle precisely.

Music
In addition to the series' main theme for Coulson, Bear McCreary composed several other themes that he used throughout the season: themes for Mike Peterson and Project: Centipede were introduced in "Pilot", with Peterson's theme becoming "a distorted, metallic, angsty version" when he becomes Deathlok; a theme for the agents as a team was introduced in "0-8-4"; the Skye theme was introduced in "The Asset", which over the season changes from something "sentimental and emotional" into something "really bittersweet,... tragic", and heroic; a theme for both Fitz and Simmons together was introduced in "FZZT"; a theme for Victoria Hand and The Hub, which served as the theme for 'Big S.H.I.E.L.D.', as opposed to Coulson's 'little S.H.I.E.L.D.' team, was introduced in "The Hub"; and individual themes for each of member of Coulson's team and "the Clairvoyant", which shifts to John Garrett when he is revealed to be "the Clairvoyant". McCreary felt the themes were not "just for specific characters" but a way to help "follow the narrative thread as the themes are transposed from one person to another". McCreary opted not to reprise any themes from the films during the season, notably composing his own themes for the Tesseract and Asgard, which he acknowledged had already appeared in several films. The soundtrack titled Marvel's Agents of S.H.I.E.L.D. (Original Soundtrack Album) featuring music from the first and second seasons, was released by Marvel Music digitally on September 4, 2015, and on CD in October 2015.

Marvel Cinematic Universe tie-ins
In June 2013, Clark Gregg explained how the series would tie into the Marvel Cinematic Universe films: "...the exciting part is going to be seeing the way that Agents of S.H.I.E.L.D. interacts with the S.H.I.E.L.D. component in Captain America 2, and the other movies, and whether those movies will then affect our show." Joss Whedon did state that the show would be autonomous from The Avengers, saying "It's gotta be a show that works for people who haven't seen the Marvel movies. It will please Marvel fans, I think." He reiterated that sentiment in an interview at the 2012 Toronto International Film Festival, explaining "It's new characters. It needs to be its own thing. It needs to be adjacent [to The Avengers]... What does S.H.I.E.L.D. have that the other superheroes don't? And that, to me, is that they're not superheroes, but they live in that universe. Even though they're a big organization, that [lack of powers] makes them underdogs, and that's interesting to me."

Ultimately, the season featured several tie-in episodes with Marvel Cinematic Universe films: the episode "The Well" takes place directly after the events of Thor: The Dark World; the episode "T.A.H.I.T.I." introduces the alien race the Kree to the MCU (confirmed as such in the second season), members of which play a significant role in Guardians of the Galaxy; and the episodes "End of the Beginning" and "Turn, Turn, Turn" revolve around the events of Captain America: The Winter Soldier. Due to Captain America: The Winter Soldier revealing that Hydra had infiltrated S.H.I.E.L.D. with sleeper agents, the season sees a retooling for the final six episodes. Regarding the synergy the show has with addressing events from the films, Loeb said "It's an extremely unique experience that doesn't exist anywhere else out there in the entertainment business". The characters simultaneously face Hydra and a power struggle within S.H.I.E.L.D., and trust issues with each other. Jed Whedon added that that Hydra sleeper agents, which the show could not address until after the release of The Winter Soldier, was an attempt to address the lack of characters from the comics, a complaint fans had throughout the season.

Marketing

Three episodes were screened before their initial air dates: "Pilot" at San Diego Comic-Con International on July 19, 2013, "Eye Spy" at New York Comic Con on October 12, 2013, and "End of the Beginning" at Marvel's PaleyFest panel for the series on March 23, 2014. Beginning with "T.A.H.I.T.I.", all episodes leading up to The Winter Soldier crossover were marketed as Agents of S.H.I.E.L.D.: Uprising. On March 18, 2014, ABC aired a one-hour television special titled Marvel Studios: Assembling a Universe in the place of an Agents of S.H.I.E.L.D. episode. The special included promotional footage for then unaired episodes of the season.

"The Art of Level Seven"
For the final six episodes, Marvel began the "Marvel's Agents of S.H.I.E.L.D.: The Art of Level Seven" initiative, in which a different image was released each Thursday before a new episode, depicting a first look at a key event from the upcoming episode. Bell stated that the initiative was a way to tie the series back to its comics roots, and was thought of at the beginning of the season. The production team tried to pair specific artists to the teaser posters based on their previous work and how it connected to the themes and emotion of the intended episode. The art also appeared as variant covers to select titles published by Marvel Comics in August 2014. Jeph Loeb stated, "It's exciting to bring this art to life once more, exclusively at comic book stores, and to give fans a chance to own the Marvel's Agents of S.H.I.E.L.D. art in a different format."

The poster for "Turn, Turn, Turn", created by Mike Del Mundo, depicts a maze forming the S.H.I.E.L.D. logo and show title, with a rat inside. The poster for "Providence", created by Paolo Rivera, highlights the rise of Hydra by showing a melded Hydra and S.H.I.E.L.D. logo, and depicts the team divided by Coulson, Raina, and Ward. The poster for "The Only Light in the Darkness", created by Pascal Campion, focuses on Coulson and his cellist lover, Audrey, while also hinting at the villain for the episode, Marcus Daniels. The poster for "Nothing Personal", created by Stephanie Hans, shows Skye and Ward with Deathlok above them and the S.H.I.E.L.D. logo in the background. The poster for "Ragtag" was created by Emma Ríos is an amalgamation of Ward's life, Fitz–Simmons in danger, and Skye behind the S.H.I.E.L.D. logo. The poster for "Beginning of the End", created by Phantom City Creative, recalls the first, official poster, but changes the order of the characters, their clothing, and palette. Above them is a broken S.H.I.E.L.D. logo that reveal's Hydra's, which emits light that reflects onto Ward.

Release

Broadcast
Along with the premiere in the United States on ABC, the season began airing in Canada on CTV on September 24, 2013. In the United Kingdom, the season debuted three days later on Channel 4, while it began airing on the Seven Network in Australia on October 2, 2013, and in New Zealand on TV2 on February 16, 2014.

Home media
The season was released on September 9, 2014, on Blu-ray and DVD. Bonus features included behind-the-scenes featurettes, audio commentary, deleted scenes, a blooper reel, as well as the television special, Marvel Studios: Assembling a Universe. On November 20, 2014, the season became available for streaming on Netflix in the United States, and was available until February 28, 2022. It became available on Disney+ in the United States on March 16, 2022, joining other territories where it was already available on the service.

Reception

Ratings

As of September 30, 2013, an estimated 22.1 million viewers have watched the premiere episode in the US through live, DVR, encore, and online viewing. In Canada, the premiere saw 2.706 million viewers, the third highest viewership for the week on the network. In the United Kingdom, the episode debuted as the highest rated drama launch of the year, averaging 3.23 million viewers including the +1 channel and recordings viewed the same night, a share of 14.8 percent of people watching TV in the UK at the time. The premiere in Australia was watched by 1.3 million viewers, the top show of the night. In New Zealand, the episode premiered to 326,790 viewers, the fourth highest show of the night, and the most watched show on TV2. By the time the full season was picked up by ABC it ranked as the number one new series of the 2013–14 television season among adults 18–49. The season averaged 8.31 million total viewers, ranking 43rd among network series. It also had an average total 18-49 rating of 3.0, which was 20th.

Critical response
The review aggregator website Rotten Tomatoes reports an 88% approval rating with an average score of 7.83/10, based on 72 reviews. The website's consensus reads, "Marvel's Agents of S.H.I.E.L.D. is sure to please comic book fans, but the strong ensemble and brisk pacing help to make this better-than-average superhero show accessible to non-fanboys as well." Metacritic, which uses a weighted average, assigned a score of 74 out of 100 based on 33 reviews, indicating "generally favorable reviews." 

The early screening of the pilot at San Diego Comic-Con International was met with a very positive reaction from the crowd. Critically, the initial screening of the pilot was met with mostly positive reviews, though The New York Times Brooks Barnes noted that "what goes over well at Comic-Con does not necessarily work in the real world," especially on a network with "Scandal moms and Dancing with the Stars grandparents". Entertainment Weeklys initial reactions were that if everything that made the show appealing— its continuity with the Marvel Cinematic Universe, its continuance of The Avengers storyline, and Whedon's return to television, were stripped from it, the show would still work. However, they also questioned whether the show was accessible enough to attract a wider audience.

Evan Valentine, writing for Collider, divided the season into highs and lows: highs included the Captain America: The Winter Soldier crossover, with Valentine noting that "The creators had clearly known this moment was coming ... and did a great job of capitalizing [on] it," as well as other tie-ins with the Marvel Cinematic Universe, and he praised Gregg's performance, stating "What made us fall in love with the character from the first Iron Man to his death in The Avengers is still alive and kicking"; lows of the season included the episodes before the Winter Soldier tie-in, with Valentine feeling that the series "became the show that had to stall its developments and character building to make way for the [tie-in]." He also criticized the rest of the main cast, though he did approve of the guest and supporting cast members, and he criticized the series' use of minor comic book characters and concepts, singling out the costume design for Deathlok as "horrid" and not scary. Eric Goldman of IGN gave the season a 7.5 out of 10, calling it "a fun, lighthearted, but fairly disposable piece of entertainment", noting that it improved through the season, especially following the Captain America: The Winter Soldier tie-in, and that by the end of the season, the series "was starting to come into its own". Though he found the main cast's performances to all be good, and praised the strong guest and recurring stars, Goldman found the main characterizations to be weak during the first half of the season, and he also criticized the pacing of certain overarching plotlines, noting "the mystery of Coulson's return, Skye's parentage, etc. – moved far too slow, with relatively minor revelations treated as though they were big reveals". 

Jim Steranko, an artist and writer who worked on the Nick Fury: Agent of S.H.I.E.L.D. comic between 1966 and 1968, was critical of the pilot episode, lamenting that "the show had no menace, no tension." For the second episode, Steranko said that it was "too unfocused to be satisfying," but praised Jackson's cameo as Nick Fury as "an electrifying reminder of what the series could and should be." In contrast, Steranko's opinion of some later episodes in the first season were more positive, congratulating the writer and director of "The End of the Beginning" for "finding an entertaining, bravura groove that finally brings the concept to life", and saying of the next episode "I was concerned that last week's bravura transformation was only a fluke, but it was apparent from the opening moments that the exec lineup's new image-and-edit policy was in play." Overall, however, he found season one to be "22 episodes of 'sanctified' plot and character crumbs being salted with terminally-sluggish velocity (into anemic 'standalone' stories)".

Analysis
Both the way the series was affected by the destruction of S.H.I.E.L.D. in Captain America: The Winter Soldier and the way its characters are depicted rebuilding the organization have been noted by some:

Terri Schwartz, writing for Zap2it following the airing of "Nothing Personal", called the series "incredible", stating that it "got off to a rocky start", but that changed once the Winter Soldier tie-in took place. Schwartz felt that the season earned many of its early criticisms from having to "bide time" until the crossover, but "Now that it has the freedom to be the series it was always intended to, Marvel's Agents of S.H.I.E.L.D. has turned into a fantastic show. Its connection to Marvel's Cinematic Universe is clear: This is where viewers get to see the fallout of Hydra's S.H.I.E.L.D. infiltration. And the fact that the movie so influenced the show is game-changing in terms of how the mediums of film and television can be interwoven."

Merrill Barr, reviewing "Beginning of the End" for Forbes, reiterated this sentiment, stating that "the series finally stands its ground and stakes its claim as a member of the Marvel Cinematic Universe ... By establishing world changing consequences that don't just affect one MCU franchise, but all of them." He continues saying that "what Marvel's daring to say with this season finale is "everything we do matters, and you need to pay attention to all of it." ... It's been a long journey, and there's no question many viewers' patience wore thin toward the end, but that never stopped Marvel from pushing forward to one of the most entertaining hours of television this season and finally cementing a deserved place on the small screen."

Mary McNamara of the Los Angeles Times felt that the series "created a whole new sort of television show: One that must support, and change with, the plot twists of its film family ... never before has television been literally married to film, charged with filling in the back story and creating the connective tissue of an ongoing film franchise." She stated that the Captain America: The Winter Soldier crossover "infused S.H.I.E.L.D. with a new energy, and helped explain, perhaps, why the show took so long to find its footing—in the writers' room at least ... That Agents of S.H.I.E.L.D. was able to succeed as a story both independent and ancillary is all but miraculous." She concluded that the series "is now not only a very good show in its own right, it's part of Marvel's multiplatform city-state. It faces a future of perpetual re-invention, and that puts it in the exhilarating first car of television's roller-coaster ride toward possible world domination."

Accolades

|-
! scope="row" | 2013
| Critics' Choice Television Awards
| Most Exciting New Series
| Agents of S.H.I.E.L.D.
| 
| 
|-
! scope="row" rowspan="8" | 2014
| rowspan="2" | People's Choice Awards
| Favorite Actress in a New TV Series
| Ming-Na Wen
| 
| 
|-
| Favorite New TV Drama
| Agents of S.H.I.E.L.D.
| 
| 
|-
| Visual Effects Society Awards
| Outstanding Visual Effects in a Broadcast Program
| "Pilot"
| 
| 
|-
| Golden Reel Awards
| Best Sound Editing – Short Form: Music
| "Pilot"
| 
| 
|-
| Satellite Awards
| Best Television Series or Miniseries, Genre
| Agents of S.H.I.E.L.D.
| 
| 
|-
| Saturn Award
| Best Network Television Series Release
| Agents of S.H.I.E.L.D.
| 
| 
|-
| Teen Choice Awards
| Male Breakout Star
| Brett Dalton
| 
| 
|-
| Primetime Creative Arts Emmy Awards
| Outstanding Special and Visual Effects
| "T.A.H.I.T.I."
| 
| 
|}

Notes

References

General references

External links
 

 
2013 American television seasons
2014 American television seasons
Television series set in 2013
Television series set in 2014